The Puerto Rico USL-MLS Challenge was a preseason invitational football tournament featuring the host club Puerto Rico Islanders, two clubs from Major League Soccer and a USL First Division club. The tournament was played in Juan Ramón Loubriel Stadium in Bayamon, Puerto Rico. The first edition features the MLS clubs: Los Angeles Galaxy and F.C. Dallas, and USL clubs: Puerto Rico Islanders and Rochester Rhinos. Los Angeles Galaxy won the tournament after 2-1 win over the Puerto Rico Islanders. The tournament was again celebrated in 2009 featuring only a match between MLS club D.C. United and the Puerto Rico Islanders. D.C. United won the tournament after a 2-1 win.

2007

Winners -LA Galaxy

2009

Puerto Rico Islanders
International association football competitions hosted by Puerto Rico
2007 in Puerto Rican football
2009 in Puerto Rican football
2007 Major League Soccer season
2009 Major League Soccer season
2009 United Soccer Leagues